Michael Wayne Clark (born 31 March 1978) is an Australian former cricketer and Australian rules footballer.

Football career 
Clark had shoulder problems when he played with Swan Districts in 1996, and in 1997 required a knee reconstruction.

The son of former Australian Test cricketer Wayne Clark, he pursued a career in the Australian Football League with the Fremantle Dockers. Drafted in the 1997 AFL Draft, he played only 1 game with the Dockers in 1999. He was delisted at the end of that year to be re-drafted by the Collingwood Football Club in the 1999 AFL Draft, but did not manage a senior game with the club, being delisted during the 2000 season after fracturing his fibula.

Cricket career 
He made his debut with Western Australia in the 2000–2001 season, and after chronic back-injury problems, announced his retirement from cricket in February 2006.

References

External links 

Western Australia cricketers
Fremantle Football Club players
1978 births
Living people
Warwickshire cricketers
Australian cricketers
Cricketers from Perth, Western Australia
Sportsmen from Western Australia
Australian rules footballers from Perth, Western Australia
Swan Districts Football Club players
South Fremantle Football Club players